Przewalskia is a genus of flowering plants belonging to the family Solanaceae.

Its native range is western and central China, Tibet to eastern Himalaya.

The genus name of Przewalskia is in honour of Nikolay Przhevalsky (1839–1888), a Russian Imperial geographer and a renowned explorer of Central and East Asia. 
It was first described and published in Bull. Acad. Imp. Sci. Saint-Pétersbourg, séries 3, Vol.27 on page 507 in 1882.

Known species, according to Kew:
Przewalskia shebbearei 
Przewalskia tangutica

References

Solanaceae
Solanaceae genera
Plants described in 1882
Flora of North-Central China
Flora of South-Central China
Flora of Qinghai
Flora of Tibet
Flora of East Himalaya